Theatre is an album by Swiss pianist, composer, and arranger George Gruntz's Concert Jazz Band '83 recorded in 1983 and released on the ECM label.

Reception
The Allmusic review by Scott Yanow awarded the album 2½ stars stating "the music overall is for selective tastes and it never really seems to flow, making it of limited interest".

Track listing
All compositions by George Gruntz except as indicated
 "El Chancho" (Dino Saluzzi) - 15:18 
 "In the Tradition of Switzerland" - 9:21 
 "No One Can Explain It" - 6:27 
 "The Holy Grail of Jazz and Joy" - 25:20 
Recorded at Tonstudio Bauer in Ludwigsburg, West Germany in July 1983

Personnel
 George Gruntz – keyboards
 Marcus Belgrave – trumpet
 Tom Harrell – trumpet, flugelhorn
 Palle Mikkelborg – trumpet
 Bill Pusey – trumpet, flugelhorn
 Julian Priester – trombone
 Dave Bargeron – trombone, euphonium
 Dave Taylor – bass trombone
 Peter Gordon – French horn
 Tom Varner – French horn
 Howard Johnson – tuba, bass clarinet, baritone saxophone
 Charlie Mariano – alto and soprano saxophones, flute
 Ernst-Ludwig Petrowsky – alto and soprano saxophones, clarinet  
 Seppo Paakkunainen – tenor saxophone, flute  
 Dino Saluzzi – bandoneon
 Mark Egan –  bass guitar
 Bob Moses – drums
 Sheila Jordan – vocals

References

ECM Records albums
1984 albums
Albums produced by Manfred Eicher
George Gruntz albums